This is a list of notable people from Vallejo, California.

Actors and actresses

Monique Alexander, porn star
April Bowlby, actress
Raymond Burr, actor 
Raphael Cruz, acrobat and actor
Rockmond Dunbar, actor
Rick Jay Glen, actor
Buddy Joe Hooker, actor
Bud Jamison, actor 
Wesley Mann, actor
Keely Shaye Smith, actress

Artists

Howard Fried, conceptual artist
Helen Gilbert, painter, kinetic sculptor
Cleven "Goodie" Goudeau, award-winning art director/cartoonist
Harrison McIntosh, ceramic artist
Helen Sewell, illustrator

Athletes 

 
C. J. Anderson, National Football League player
Brandon Armstrong, National Basketball Association player
Dick Bass, National Football League player 
Jahvid Best, National Football League player
Jabari Bird, pro basketball player
Ping Bodie, Major League Baseball player
Bobby Brooks, Major League Baseball player
Bill Buckner, Major League Baseball player 
Willie Calhoun, professional baseball player
Tyler Cravy, Major League Baseball Player
Joey Chestnut, competitive eater
Natalie Coughlin, swimmer with 12 Olympic medals
Ward Cuff, National Football League player
Thomas DeCoud, National Football League player
Mike Felder, Major League Baseball player
Augie Garrido, University of Texas baseball coach
Jeff Gordon, NASCAR 4-time champion, 5-time Brickyard 400 winner, 3-time Daytona 500 winner 
Damon Hollins, Major League Baseball player
Fulton Kuykendall, National Football League player
Tony Longmire, Major League Baseball player
Tug McGraw, Major League Baseball player 
Mike Merriweather, National Football League player
Mark Muñoz, Ultimate Fighting Championship fighter
DeMarcus Nelson, National Basketball Association player
Rashad Ross, National Football League player
CC Sabathia, Major League Baseball player
Sammie Stroughter, National Football League player
Joe Taufete'e, player for USA Rugby
Barton Williams, Olympian track and field

Musicians 

B-Legit
Baby Bash
Celly Cel
Con Funk Shun
DJ D-Wrek
Droop-E
E-40
Funky Aztecs
H.E.R.
Johnny Otis
J-Diggs
Khayree
Little Bruce
Mac Dre
Mac Mall
The Mossie
N2Deep
Nef the Pharaoh
Norma Tanega
One Vo1ce
Paul Foster
Reek Daddy
Roy Rogers
Sleep Dank
Sly Stone
SOB X RBE
Suga T
The Click
Turf Talk
Young Lay
Dubee

Other notable figures
Ed Rollins, political advisor 
Zodiac Killer, serial killer

Writers

Genea Brice, first poet laureate of Vallejo, California 
Ernest J. Gaines
Gregory Allen Howard
Charles Jordan
Mark Joseph
D.L. Lang, second poet laureate of Vallejo, California 
Dwayne Parish, first poet laureate of Richmond, California, grew up in Vallejo
Norman Partridge
Nina Serrano poet, filmmaker, KPFA radio host
Helen Sewell
Keely Shaye Smith
Jeremy Snyder, third poet laureate of Vallejo, California. 
James Tracy

References

People from Vallejo, California
Vallejo
San Francisco Bay Area-related lists
Vallejo